William Burnham may refer to:
 William H. Burnham (1855–1941), American educational psychologist
 William P. Burnham (1860–1930), United States Army general
 William Addison Burnham, co-founder of Lord & Burnham, American boiler and greenhouse manufacturer
 Willie Burnham (fl. 1930–1934), American baseball player